The men's light flyweight event was part of the boxing programme at the 1992 Summer Olympics. The weight class was the lightest contested, and allowed boxers of up to 48 kilograms to compete. The competition was held from 26 July to 8 August 1992. 30 boxers from 30 nations competed.

Medalists

Results
The following boxers took part in the event:

References

Light Flyweight